Rennellia is a genus of flowering plants belonging to the family Rubiaceae.

Its native range is Indo-China to western Malesia. It is found in Borneo, Malaya, Myanmar, the Nicobar Islands, Sumatera and Thailand.
 
The genus name of Rennellia is in honour of James Rennell (1742–1830), an English geographer, historian and a pioneer of oceanography. 
It was first described and published in Ned. Kruidk. Arch. Vol.2 (Issue 2) on page 255 in 1851.

Known species
According to Kew:

References

Rubiaceae
Rubiaceae genera
Plants described in 1851
Flora of Malesia
Flora of Indo-China